Rowing events were held from 30 September 2022 to 2 October 2022 at Mahatma Mandir, Convictional Hall Venue 1, Gandhinagar.

Medal table

Medal summary

Women's freestyle

References

2022 National Games of India
2022 in sport wrestling